The Alamgir Tower is a high rise building in Lahore, Pakistan.

Alamgir Tower had applied for approval of digging 80 feet deep below ground level but the application was not approved.  Alamgir Tower had until on August 20 they paid the fine. Construction started again and will completed in end of 2017. Alamgir Tower will stand as the tallest building of Lahore in Main Boulevard Gulberg, Lahore.

References

External links
 Official website
 Alamgir Tower, SkyscraperPage

Skyscrapers in Lahore
Buildings and structures completed in 2009